Sibusiso Nzima (born 23 November 1986) is a South African long distance runner who specialises in the marathon. He competed in the marathon event at the 2015 World Championships in Athletics in Beijing, China.

He competed in the marathon at the 2016 Summer Olympics in Rio de Janeiro. He finished in 97th place with a time of 2:25:33. He also competed at the August 2017 London IAAF World Championships men’s marathon however he failed to finish.

References

External links

1986 births
Living people
South African male long-distance runners
South African male marathon runners
World Athletics Championships athletes for South Africa
Place of birth missing (living people)